La feria de Jalisco is a 1948 Mexican musical comedy film directed by Chano Urueta and starring Ramón Armengod, Ninón Sevilla and Perla Aguiar.

Cast 

 Ramón Armengod
 Ninón Sevilla
 Perla Aguiar
 Andrés Soler
 Emma Roldán
 Aurora Walker
 Enrique García Álvarez
 José Eduardo Pérez
 Alicia Ravel
 José Pulido

References 

1948 musical comedy films
Films directed by Chano Urueta
1940s Spanish-language films
Mexican musical comedy films
1940s Mexican films